Greatest & Latest is a music album by the American rock band Warrant originally released in 1999. The album contains new recorded studio versions of their ("greatest") material with three previously unreleased ("latest") songs "The Jones", "Southern Comfort" and "Bad Tattoo."

Background
The album was re released twice in 2004 under new titles 'Cherry Pie all the Hitz 'n' More and the import version Most Wanted with slightly different track lists.

The album has new versions of Warrant's biggest hit singles "Heaven", which peaked at number 2 on The Billboard Hot 100, and "Cherry Pie", which peaked at #10. The re-recorded "Heaven" and "Cherry Pie" were released as promo and later iTunes singles and were also released on several mixed compilation albums. In 2004, Jani Lane re-recorded acoustic versions of "Cherry Pie" and "Heaven" which appeared on the "VH1 Classic Metal Mania: Stripped" compilations. 
 
"Heaven" was used in Tool Academys series finale and was covered by the American punk band New Found Glory on the compilation album Punk Goes Metal.

Track listing 
 "Cherry Pie '99"
 "The Jones"*
 "Down Boys '99"
 "Southern Comfort"* (co-written with Todd Meagher)
 "Hollywood (So Far, So Good) '99"
 "Uncle Tom's Cabin '99"
 "Sometimes She Cries '99"
 "32 Pennies '99"
 "Heaven '99"
 "Thin Disguise '99"
 "I Saw Red '99"
 "Bad Tattoo"*
 "Down Boys (Julian Beeston Remix)" - (Bonus track)
 "Cherry Pie (Sigue Sigue Sputnik Remix)" - (Bonus track)
 "32 Pennies (Meeks Remix)" - (Bonus track)
 "Down Boys (Razed in Black Remix)" - (Bonus track)

"Cherry Pie all the Hitz 'n' More" - instead of the last four club mixes it has two cover songs
"Lay Your Hands on Me" (Bon Jovi cover)
 "Photograph" (Def Leppard cover)

"Most Wanted''" - instead of the last four club mixes it has four cover songs
 "Lay Your Hands on Me" (Bon Jovi cover)
 "Photograph" (Def Leppard cover)
 "I Want You to Want Me" (Cheap Trick cover)
 "Free for All" (Ted Nugent cover)

Credits
Jani Lane - lead vocals
Erik Turner - guitar
Jerry Dixon - bass guitar
Rick Steier - lead guitar
Bobby Borg - drums (for the new songs marked with *)

Additional personnel
Danny Wagner - keyboards
Mitch Dynamite (a.k.a. Jani Lane) - drums

References

External links 
 Warrant official web site
 Classic Warrant videos on Sony BMG MusicBox

Warrant (American band) albums
1999 albums